Scott Walter Murray (born 1954) is an American attorney who served as the United States Attorney for the District of New Hampshire from 2018 to 2021. Prior to assuming his current role, he was the Merrimack County Attorney in New Hampshire. From 1983 to 2011, Murray served as the chief prosecutor for the city of Concord, New Hampshire. Murray was confirmed to be a U.S. Attorney on February 15, 2018, and sworn into office on March 5, 2018. On February 8, 2021, he along with 55 other Trump-era attorneys were asked to resign. On March 2, 2021, Murray announced his resignation, effective March 6, 2021.

References

External links
 Biography at U.S. Department of Justice

1954 births
Living people
New Hampshire lawyers
People from Rochester, New Hampshire
University of New Hampshire alumni
21st-century American lawyers
United States Attorneys for the District of New Hampshire